Scoon is a surname and may refer to:

 Paul Scoon (1935–2013), Governor General of Grenada from 1978 to 1992
 Paula Gopee-Scoon (born 1958), politician from Trinidad and Tobago, Minister of Foreign Affairs in the Manning Administration from 2007 to 2010
 Thompson M. Scoon (1888–1953), New York politician

See also
 6632 Scoon, a main-belt asteroid